Wyle or WYLE may refer to:

 WYLE (FM), a radio station (95.1 FM) licensed to serve Grove City, Pennsylvania, United States
WYLE (TV), commercial television station in Florence, Alabama
Wyle Laboratories, provider of specialized engineering, scientific and technical services

People
Florence Wyle (1881–1968), American-born Canadian sculptor and designer
George Wyle (1916–2003),American orchestra leader and composer 
Noah Wyle (born 1971), American actor
Walter de la Wyle, Bishop of Salisbury from 1263 to 1271

See also
 Wiley (disambiguation)
 John Wiley (disambiguation)
 Whiley
 Wily (disambiguation)
 Wylie (disambiguation)
 Wyllie
 Willey (disambiguation)
 Wylye (disambiguation)
 Wyly